All Saints Catholic Senior College is an independent Roman Catholic co-educational senior secondary day school located in the south-western Sydney suburb of Casula, New South Wales, Australia. The College has a maximum enrolment of approximately 600 students.

History

Prior to 1987 children of the Parish of All Saints, Liverpool could choose to receive a secondary Catholic education by attending Patrician Brothers' Boys High Liverpool and Saint Mary's Girls High Liverpool and receive the NSW School Certificate as their highest certification.

In 1984 an action group of parents, chaired by Ray McMahon, was established to raise support for the establishment of a Catholic senior secondary school in Liverpool. Such a development was already a priority of Liverpool Parish priest Father Roth Delaney and together they lobbied government and Catholic education office bearers while raising community support and funding for the school. Originally planned for Ashcroft, land negotiations lead to the final site location in Leacocks Lane, Casula.

In 1987, All Saints Catholic Senior High School, was established by the Roman Catholic Archdiocese of Sydney and classes began in temporary demountable classrooms on 2 February 1987 on the site of St Mary's High and Patrician Brothers' High, Liverpool. Following a rapid ten-week construction, the current Leacocks Lane campus was opened in 1988 with 380 students and 29 teaching staff. The College was officially blessed on Sunday 27 March 1988 by Archbishop Edward Clancy after which permanent building construction began.

Other names

Later changes to the naming of its principal feeder schools, from Patrician Brothers Boys High Liverpool to All Saints Catholic Boys College and Saint Mary's Girls High Liverpool to All Saints Catholic Girls College saw the senior school adopt the new title of All Saints Catholic Senior College. More recently, amalgamation of the two junior campuses into a coeducational campus has led to the current trichotomy of All Saints K-12 education in Liverpool:
 All Saints Catholic Primary School (K-6)
 All Saints Catholic College (7-10)
 All Saints Catholic Senior College (11-12)

College patrons, vision and mission
The Patron Saints of the college are:
 Óscar Romero (1917–1980)
 Saint Teresa of Calcutta (1910–1997)

Recent developments

Father Delaney Learning Centre 
Completed in September 2015, the Father Delaney Learning Centre is a complete refurbishment of the existing library and chapel to a modern, flexible learning environment. Designed around Thornburg's four 'archetypal learning spaces' (Campfire, Watering Hole, Cave, Life) the learning centre offers a variety of different spaces to cater for the differing learning needs of students.

New Science Block 
In 2010, construction started for a new science block, that will allow the students to pursue even greater paths in their career than the current science block. This science block was completed for use in the closing months of the same year.

The block consists of specialised 4 labs (L1, L2, L3, L4) for each of the science subjects taught; Senior Science, Physics, Biology, Chemistry but are not limited to these subjects where other courses such as Engineering are also taught.

Multipurpose Hall 
Construction began in January 2007 on a multipurpose hall and five additional classrooms to meet increasing enrolment needs and an expected expansion of the school curriculum. The multipurpose hall was in part meant to allow for school assemblies and other large meetings indoors.

See also

List of Catholic schools in New South Wales

References

External links
 All Saints Catholic Senior College Official site
 All Saints Official site

Catholic secondary schools in Sydney
Educational institutions established in 1987
1987 establishments in Australia
Liverpool, New South Wales
Roman Catholic Archdiocese of Sydney